is a passenger railway station located in the city of Hitachi, Ibaraki Prefecture, Japan operated by the East Japan Railway Company (JR East).

Lines
Jūō Station is served by the Jōban Line, and is located 156.6 km from the official starting point of the line at Nippori Station.

Station layout
The station has consists of one elevated island platform connected to the station building by an underground passageway. It is staffed.

Platforms

History
The station was absorbed into the JR East network upon the privatization of the Japanese National Railways (JNR) on 1 April 1987. It was renamed to its present name on 13 March 2004.

Passenger statistics
In fiscal 2019, the station was used by an average of 2957 passengers daily (boarding passengers only).

Surrounding area
 Jūō Post Office

See also
 List of railway stations in Japan

References

External links

 Station information JR East Station Information 

Railway stations in Ibaraki Prefecture
Jōban Line
Railway stations in Japan opened in 1897
Hitachi, Ibaraki